The GE U30C is a six-axle locomotive built by General Electric from 1966 to 1976. With 600 units sold, the U30C proved to be a viable alternative for customers who were unable to purchase SD40s from Electro-Motive Diesel (EMD) due to production backlog. Throughout its ten-year production span, the U30C was known for reliability issues concerning its electrical system. However, most railroads were assured of the reliability of the GE Model 752 DC traction motor, and began to place orders for U30Cs starting in 1966. When production ended, the last U30Cs carried pre-Dash 7 specifications, which would be carried in its replacement, the GE C30-7.

The U30C served customers of all kinds, from mining, to general freights, coal trains, and even as a power source unit for the Department of Transportation's subway-car test tracks in Pueblo, Colorado before a connection from the commercial electric power grid could be established .

Not to be outdone in the freight sector, GE produced a passenger version of the locomotive, the GE U30CG. The U30CG only sold six units for the Atchison, Topeka & Santa Fe Railroad.

When most U30Cs were being retired due to old age and mechanical or electrical problems, General Electric initiated a rebuild program where older Universal Series locomotives would be upgraded with the latest technology and fuel-saving systems. GE would then strip the locomotive down to its frame and engine, and completely rebuild the locomotive with new components. When completed, the unit would receive a new designation: GE C30-S7R (R for Rebuilt frame of traded-in locomotive). In the later years, the rebuild frame was discontinued, and a brand new frame would be used, re-designating the locomotive as GE C30-S7N (N for New frame). The only external difference was a large vent on the fireman's side ahead of the engine compartment. The final variation came with the discontinued frame of the Universal series and instead, using GE C40-8 kits. This new model also featured a microprocessor, officially designating this locomotive as GE C30-S7NMP.

A variant of the U20C export locomotive was known as the U30C. This version is unrelated to the U30C built for North America.

Original owners

Images

See also 
 Iranian locomotives

References

External links

 Thompson, David. GE U30C Original Owners

Diesel-electric locomotives of the United States
U30C
C-C locomotives
Railway locomotives introduced in 1966
Freight locomotives
Standard gauge locomotives of the United States
Standard gauge locomotives of Mexico
Diesel-electric locomotives of Mexico